Düsum Khyenpa (1110–1193) was the 1st Gyalwa Karmapa, head of the Karma Kagyu school of Tibetan Buddhism.

Düsum Khyenpa means "knower of the three times" (past, present and future). It was given to him to refer to knowledge of the three forms of time he gained at enlightenment including the "timeless time" of enlightened awareness.

History
Düsum Khyenpa was born to a devout family of Buddhist practitioners in Teshö in Kham and was called Gephel as a child. He first studied with his father and then continued training with other Buddhist teachers in the region.

Gephel was a gifted child who studied and practiced Buddhism intently from an early age. Already quite learned by the age of twenty, he became a monk and studied the sutras and tantras intensively for another ten years. At thirty, he went to Daklha Gampo, the monastery of Gampopa, to receive teachings from him. He trained formally in the foundation practices of the Kadam tradition and, following that, in the general philosophy of the sutras during his time there.

Gephel received empowerments and instruction in the Hevajra tantra and spent four years in strict retreat, training in śamatha and vipaśyanā. He then received the full transmission of the inner instructions of the Kagyu tradition. In nine days he absorbed what Naropa had received over 12 years from Tilopa. Rechungpa, the "moon-like" disciple of Milarepa, also instructed him, principally in the Six Yogas of Naropa. His attainment in one of these -- tummo —was particularly boosted by his own natural compassion and produced rapid results. Following his teacher's instruction he then went away to meditate.

Gampopa eventually died and Dusum Khyenpa returned to Daklha Gampo to honor his remains. He had a powerful vision of his teacher and knew that it was time to implement one of his final instructions: to go to the place where he would achieve enlightenment—Kampo Kangra—and there to practice mahamudra. He promised that he would live until the age of 84, in order to benefit the Dharma. He achieved enlightenment at the age of fifty, while practicing dream yoga. He had a vision at that time of the dakinis offering him a vajra crown woven from their hair.

From then onwards his teaching activity was intense. At the age of 58 he founded a monastery at Kampo Nenang. He later established an important seat at Karma Gon Monastery in Chamdo in Kham and, at the age of 74, another seat at Tsurphu Monastery in Ü-Tsang in the valley of the Tolung River, which feeds into the Brahmaputra River.

The abbot of the Buddhist monastery at Bodh Gaya sent a conch to Düsum Khyenpa at Tsurphu. Conch symbolism is found in many stories of the sixteen Karmapas.

Düsum Khyenpa made predictions about future Karmapas. In particular, he was the first Karmapa to present a prediction letter detailing his future incarnation. He gave it to his main disciple, Drogon Rechen, predecessor of the Tai Situpa line. He died at the age of 84. His heart was found intact in the funeral pyre and some of his remaining bones bore self manifesting symbols of Buddhas.

Among his main disciples were Taklung Thangpa Tashi Pal, founder of the Taklung Kagyu; Tsangpa Gyare, founder of the Drukpa Lineage now widespread in Bhutan; and the Nyingma master Katok Dampa Deshek, founder of Katok Monastery.

The forefathers in the Kagyu lineage are known as the "Golden Rosary." The lineage of the Kagyu emphasizes the continuity of oral instructions passed on from master to student. The principal student who held the lineage of the Golden Rosary from the First Karmapa was Drogon Rechen.

An ink and gouache drawing of Düsum Khyenpa was found in a statue of the Buddha and is in the Victoria and Albert Museum.

See also
Tulku
Lucid dream

Footnotes

References
Note: This text is based on the abstract from Ken Holmes book Karmapa on the web site  used with the author's permission. Other sources are indicated by footnotes.
 Ken Holmes, Karmapa, Altea Publishing 1995, . Author's website
 
 Lama Kunsang, Lama Pemo, Marie Aubèle (2012). History of the Karmapas: The Odyssey of the Tibetan Masters with the Black Crown. Snow Lion Publications, Ithaca, New York. .
 First Karmapa: The Life and Teachings of Dusum Khyenpa (2012), Translated by Michele Martin & David Karma Choepel, KTD Publications, New York. .

External links
The First Karmapa Düsum Khyenpa (1110 - 1193) kagyuoffice

1
1110 births
1193 deaths
12th-century Tibetan people